Pulvinula is a genus of fungi in the family Pyronemataceae. The genus was described by French mycologist Jean Louis Émile Boudier in 1885.

Species
Pulvinula alba
Pulvinula albida
Pulvinula anthracobia
Pulvinula archeri
Pulvinula carbonaria
Pulvinula cinnabarina
Pulvinula convexella
Pulvinula discoidea
Pulvinula etiolata
Pulvinula globifera
Pulvinula guizhouensis
Pulvinula johannis
Pulvinula lacteoalba
Pulvinula laeterubra
Pulvinula miltina
Pulvinula minor
Pulvinula multiguttula
Pulvinula mussooriensis
Pulvinula neotropica
Pulvinula nepalensis
Pulvinula niveoalba
Pulvinula orichalcea
Pulvinula pyrophila
Pulvinula salmonicolor
Pulvinula subaurantia
Pulvinula tetraspora

References

Pyronemataceae
Pezizales genera
Taxa named by Jean Louis Émile Boudier
Taxa described in 1885